Erysodienone is a key precursor in the biosynthesis of many Erythrina-produced alkaloids. Early work was done by Derek Barton and co-workers to illustrate the biosynthetic pathways towards erythrina alkaloids. It was demonstrated that erysodienone could be synthesized from simple starting materials by a similar approach as its biosynthetic pathway, which led to the development of the biomimetic synthesis of erysodienone.

Synthesis
The biosynthesis of erysodienone involves a key step of oxidative phenol coupling. Starting with S-norprotosinomenine precursor A, cyclization via oxidative phenol coupling forms intermediate B, which in turn can be rearranged to form intermediate C. Hydrogenation of C forms the diphenoquinone intermediate E. An intramolecular Michael addition reaction converts E to the final product, erysodienone.

A biomimetic synthesis route for erysodienone was developed based on a similar oxidative phenol coupling mechanism. Barton and co-workers found that treating bisphenolethylamine precursor F with oxidants such as K3Fe(CN)6 initiated oxidative phenol coupling to form the 9-membered ring structure in intermediate D that itself undergo a Michael addition to give erysodienone.

References

Further reading

Indolizidines
Isoquinoline alkaloids